The 1937 Stanley Cup Finals was contested by the defending champion Detroit Red Wings and the New York Rangers in their fifth Finals series appearance. Detroit would win the series 3–2 to win their second and second-straight Stanley Cup.

Paths to the Finals
Detroit defeated Montreal Canadiens in a best-of-five 3–2 to advance to the Finals. The Rangers had to play two best-of three series; winning 2–0 against Toronto Maple Leafs, and 2–0 against the Montreal Maroons to advance to the Finals.

Game summaries
New York could not use Madison Square Garden after game one because of the annual circus visit.

Earl Robertson, the goaltender for the Wings, became the first rookie goaltender to post two shutouts in the Finals. He would not play again for the Wings.

The Wings became the first U.S.-based team to win the Stanley Cup two years in a row.

Stanley Cup engraving
The 1937 Stanley Cup was presented to Red Wings captain Doug Young by NHL President Frank Calder following the Red Wings 3–0 win over the Rangers in game five.

The following Red Wings players and staff had their names engraved on the Stanley Cup

1936–37 Detroit Red Wings

See also
 1936–37 NHL season

References & notes

 Podnieks, Andrew; Hockey Hall of Fame (2004). Lord Stanley's Cup. Bolton, Ont.: Fenn Pub. pp 12, 50. 

Stanley Cup
Stanley Cup Finals
Detroit Red Wings games
New York Rangers games
Stanley Cup Finals
Stanley Cup Finals
Stanley Cup Finals
Ice hockey competitions in New York City
Ice hockey competitions in Detroit
Stanley Cup Finals
1930s in Manhattan
Madison Square Garden